Kiashahr District is a district (bakhsh) in Astaneh-ye Ashrafiyeh County, Gilan Province, Iran. At the 2006 census, its population was 34,934, in 10,510 families.  The District has one city: Kiashahr.  The District has two rural districts (dehestan): Dehgah Rural District and Kiashahr Rural District.

References 

Astaneh-ye Ashrafiyeh County
Districts of Gilan Province